Pedro Sérgio dos Santos Maia de Sousa (July 22, 1977 – May 5, 2013), simply known as Peu Sousa, was a Brazilian guitarist, songwriter and record producer.

Biography

Career
Peu Sousa was born in Salvador, Bahia on July 22, 1977, and was the stepson of Novos Baianos member Luiz Galvão. He began his career in 1995 with the band Dois Sapos e Meio, which lasted until 1999, and later served as a live musician during performances of Carlinhos Brown and his stepfather. In 2003 he was invited by singer Pitty to be part of her live band; he stayed for one year, during which he was the guitarist of her debut Admirável Chip Novo and co-wrote the track "Déjà-Vu" off her 2005 album Anacrônico.

In 2005 he formed the band Trêmula, which was nominated for a MTV Video Music Brazil award. His final music project was the short-lived Nove Mil Anjos, alongside Junior Lima, Champignon and Perí Carpigiani.

Suicide
Sousa began to struggle with depression during his final years. On May 5, 2013, after a discussion with his wife, she left their house in Itapoã with their two children; after returning, she found Sousa hanging from their bedroom ceiling with a belt around his neck. The police ruled his death as a suicide. Sousa's brother Lahiri Galvão, however, claimed on an interview that he found "very unlikely" that he was driven to suicide merely because of the argument with his wife, and his former Nove Mil Anjos bandmate Champignon (who himself committed suicide four months after Sousa) stated that "for a while, Peu had lost his faith in life". Junior Lima and Pitty later made statements on his death and gave their condolences.

References

External links
 

1977 births
2013 deaths
2013 suicides
Brazilian rock musicians
Brazilian male guitarists
Brazilian record producers
People from Salvador, Bahia
20th-century guitarists
21st-century guitarists
Suicides by hanging in Brazil
20th-century male musicians
21st-century male musicians